"Annie Lisle" is an 1857 ballad by Boston, Massachusetts songwriter H. S. Thompson, first published by Moulton & Clark of Newburyport, Massachusetts, and later by Oliver Ditson & Co. It is about the death of a young maiden, by what some have speculated to be tuberculosis. However, the lyric does not explicitly mention tuberculosis, or "consumption" as it was called then. The song might have slipped into obscurity had the tune not been adopted by countless colleges, universities, and high schools worldwide as their respective alma mater songs.

Lyrics

In popular culture
The tune is used for the Alma Mater songs at many high schools and universities. Cornell University is believed to be the first school to have used this melody for its Alma Mater. Other universities that use it, many with similar lyrics, include the College of William & Mary, University of Alabama, Indiana University, University of Missouri, University of Kansas, University of Georgia, University of North Carolina, Vanderbilt University, Swarthmore College, Howard Payne University,  The University of Akron, Lehigh University, and American University of Beirut.
The tune played as the Alma Mater of Springfield College on the TV show Father Knows Best, season 6, episode 8, "Margaret's Old Flame".
The tune is used in the parting song for the Kellerman Resort in the 1987 film Dirty Dancing, as well as the tune sung by the Purdue University students in the 1953 film Titanic.
The tune is played over the opening credits of the 1942 Merrie Melodies cartoon The Dover Boys at Pimento University.
The tune was featured in Hey Arnold! as the school song of PS-118
The tune was used for the Civil War battle song "Ellsworth's Avengers" [words by A. Lora Hudson, musical adaptation by S. L. Coe], paying tribute to Col. Elmer Ellsworth, the first U.S. Army officer killed in the conflict. An innkeeper shotgunned him after removing a confederate flag from the rooftop of an Alexandria, Virginia, hotel.
A snippet of the melody is sung, with different words and alongside many others, by the Butterfly in the animated movie "The Last Unicorn."
The tune is used at the end of the 1989 film Shag for the alma mater song of Spartanburg High School.
The tune is used as the melody for the alma mater song of Anarene High School in the 1971 film The Last Picture Show.

References

External links

 Annie Lisle on YouTube
 Sheet Music for "Ellsworth's Avengers" — Library of Congress — Chorus: "Strike freemen for the Union!/Sheathe your swords no more/While remains in arms a traitor/On Columbia's shore!"

Ballads
1857 songs
American college songs
Alma mater songs
Songwriter unknown